The Belding-Gaines Cemetery is a historic cemetery in Garland County, Arkansas, also referred to as Bassett-Belding-Gaines Cemetery.

Families
The marked graves are divided into four distinct family groups: the Bassett family group, the Belding and Gaines group, and the Simpson group.  The Simpson group is believed to include a significant number of burials of enslaved people of African descent. Burials at the cemetery include those of some of the area's earliest settlers of European descent, including Ludovicus Belding and William H. Gaines.

The cemetery was listed on the National Register of Historic Places in 1993.

See also
 National Register of Historic Places listings in Garland County, Arkansas

References

External Links

 DAR listing for Belding-Gaines Cemetery
 

Cemeteries on the National Register of Historic Places in Arkansas
National Register of Historic Places in Garland County, Arkansas
African-American cemeteries in Arkansas
Cemeteries established in the 19th century